A Resident Judge is in most jurisdictions the next highest ranking judge beneath the Chief Justice or, in some jurisdictions President Judge.

See also
Court
Common Law

Judges